Sunder Lal Patwa (11 November 1924 – 28 December 2016) was an Indian politician, who served as the 11th Chief Minister of Madhya Pradesh and a cabinet minister in the Government of India. He was a member of the Bharatiya Janata Party. He was the only politician who defeated congress strong man Kamal Nath in 1997 from Chhindwara constituency for member of parliament. He was born in the village of Kukreshwar located between Manasa and Rampura in the Neemuch District of Madhya Pradesh.

He was awarded Padma Vibhushan, the second-highest civilian award, posthumously in 2017 by the Government of India.

Political career

He was Chief Minister of Madhya Pradesh twice, from 20 January 1980 to 17 February 1980 as member of Janata Party and from  5 March 1990 to 15 December 1992 as leader of Bharatiya Janta Party. He began his political career with Jana Sangh which merged with Janata Party in 1977. Later members owing allegiance to Jana Sangh's Hindutva ideology broke away from Janata Party in 1980 to form Bharatiya Janata Party.

He was first elected to Lok Sabha via by-poll in Chhindwara in 1997 by defeating Congress strongman Kamal Nath in his home turf. He lost from Chhindwara in 1998 General Election.

In 1999, he was elected to the Lok Sabha from Narmadapuram constituency, and was minister in Atal Bihari Vajpayee Government from 1999 to 2001. As a legislator, he was known as strict disciplinarian.

He was associated with Indore Rajya Praja Mandal since 1941, R.S.S. since 1942 and R.S.S. Vistarak, 1947-51. He was imprisoned for seven months for participating in R.S.S. movement in 1948 and was an active worker of Jana Sangh since 1951, Chairman of District Cooperative Bank, Director, State
Cooperative Bank and State Cooperative Marketing Sangh and Treasurer, Jana Sangh from 1967-74. He was detained under M.I.S.A. during Emergency from June 1975 to January 1977. He was awarded the "Vidhan Gaurav" in the All India Conference of Presiding Officers, 1989.

He died on 28 December 2016 in Bhopal due to a heart attack at the age of 92.

Positions held
Patwa contested from a variety of seats and he held a variety of official posts:
1957-67 - MLA from Manasa
 Lost Vidhan Sabha elections from Manasa in 1967 and 1972. 
1977-1980 - MLA from Mandsaur
1980-1985 - MLA from Sehore
1985–90 - MLA from Bhojpur. But lost from Manasa. 
1990–92, 1993-97 - MLA from Bhojpur
1997-1998 : Lok Sabha Member from Chhindwara (Lok Sabha constituency) by defeating Kamal Nath
1998-99 - MLA from Bhojpur
1999-2004 : Lok Sabha Member from Narmadapuram (Lok Sabha constituency)
1957-67 - Chief Whip, Opposition Party, Madhya Pradesh Legislative Assembly
1975 - General Secretary, Jana Sangh, Madhya Pradesh
1977 - Member, Working Committee, Janata Party
20 Jan 1980 - 17 Feb 1980 - Chief Minister of Madhya Pradesh
1980-85 - Leader of Opposition, Madhya Pradesh Legislative Assembly; Chairman, Public Accounts Committee, Madhya Pradesh Legislative Assembly
1986 - President, B.J.P., Madhya Pradesh; Member, General Purposes Committee, Madhya Pradesh Legislative Assembly
5 March 1990 - 15 December 1992 - Chief Minister of Madhya Pradesh
13 Oct 1999 – 30 September 2000 - Minister of Rural Development, in Vajpayee Govt.
30 Sep 2000 – 7 Nov 2000 - Minister of Chemicals and Fertilizers, in Vajpayee Govt.
7 Nov 2000 – 1 September 2001 - Minister of Mines, in Vajpayee Govt.

Personal life
Two of his nephews entered politics on his heels. Surendra Patwa was first elected to Madhya Pradesh Vidhan Sabha from Bhojpur in 2008. He has been a minister in Madhya Pradesh state government.

His nephew Mangal Patwa (1965-2015) contested elections from Manasa seat in 1998 but lost. He became President of BJP's Neemuch District unit. Mangal Patwa died in a road accident in 2015.

References

|-

|-

|-

|-

|-

|-

1924 births
2016 deaths
Chief ministers from Bharatiya Janata Party
People from Madhya Pradesh
Chief Ministers of Madhya Pradesh
India MPs 1996–1997
India MPs 1999–2004
Madhya Pradesh MLAs 1957–1962
Madhya Pradesh MLAs 1977–1980
Madhya Pradesh MLAs 1980–1985
Madhya Pradesh MLAs 1990–1992
Lok Sabha members from Madhya Pradesh
Bharatiya Jana Sangh politicians
Leaders of the Opposition in Madhya Pradesh
People from Neemuch district
Chief ministers from Janata Party
Janata Party politicians
Bharatiya Janata Party politicians from Madhya Pradesh
Recipients of the Padma Vibhushan in public affairs